Skien Isstadion is an outdoor  ice skating rink with artificial ice in Skien, Norway. 
It is part of Skien Fritidspark at Klosterskogen.
The ice rink is used mostly by schools and families with small children. It is also used for speed skating practice. The outdoor season starts in mid-October and lasts until Easter. The ice skating rink was opened in 1985 and is equipped with floodlights.

Skien as a city hosted the Norwegian championships:
 men's allround in 1938, 1953, 1970 and 2002
 women's allround in 1955 and 2002
 men's and women's sprints in 1976 and 1990

See also
Klosterskogen Travbane

References

External links
Skien Isstadion official website
Skien fritidspark official website

Speed skating venues in Norway
Bandy venues in Norway
Sports venues in Skien
1985 establishments in Norway
Sports venues completed in 1985